KZIN-FM (96.7 MHz, "Wide Open Country"), is a radio station licensed to serve Shelby, Montana. The station is owned by Townsquare Media and licensed to Townsquare License, LLC. It airs a country music format.

The station's studios are at 830 Oilfield Avenue in Shelby, along with KSEN; the transmitter site is located on Cathedral Road, southwest of Shelby. It began broadcasting on December 9, 1978, delayed by nine months after a major 1977 fire destroyed KSEN's studios.

References

External links
KZIN-FM
 Flash Stream, MP3 Stream

ZIN-FM
Country radio stations in the United States
Toole County, Montana
Radio stations established in 1978
1978 establishments in Montana
Townsquare Media radio stations